This list of unsolved murders includes notable cases where victims have been murdered under unknown circumstances.

Before the 19th century
 The Gebelein Man (18–20), one of six naturally mummified bodies dating back to 3400 BC found in 1896 in Egypt, is suspected to have been murdered when a 2012 CAT scan determined that there were puncture wounds on his body. As with most things surrounding the mummies' lives, his murder remains a mystery.
 Ötzi, also called the Iceman, is the well-preserved natural mummy of a man who lived between 3400 and 3100 BCE. The mummy was found in September 1991 in the Ötztal Alps. The cause of death remained uncertain until 10 years after the discovery of the body. Currently, it is believed that Ötzi bled to death after being hit by an arrow which shattered the scapula and damaged nerves and blood vessels before lodging near the lung.
 Bog bodies are a numerous class of men and women which had been violently killed from prehistoric times into the Middle Ages. The victims had subsequently been dumped in swamps where they were naturally mummified. It is unclear whether the bog bodies were sacrificed, executed, or murdered. Notable examples include the Bocksten Man, the Tollund Man, and the Lindow Man.

 Agrippina the Younger (43), the empress of the Roman Empire from AD 49 to AD 54, was murdered by an unknown assailant on 23 March AD 59. Conflicting accounts are given about her murder, which remains unsolved.
 Caesarion (17), (Ptolemy XV Philopator Philometor Caesar), 30 BC; the son of Cleopatra and Julius Caesar, and as such the last king of the Ptolemaic dynasty of the Ptolemaic Kingdom of Ancient Egypt, ruling alone for eleven days, whose death at the orders of Augustus (while still Octavian) is accepted in 30 BC, and yet the exact circumstances of his death and the location of his body are not documented.
 The Emperor Valentinian II, 15 May 392; he was found hanged in his residence in Vienne in Gaul. Frankish General Arbogast claimed it was suicide, although some sources suggest that, having been dismissed by the emperor, the general had murdered him.
 Dagobert II, 679; he was one of the last Merovingian kings, murdered in the Ardennes Forest on 23 December. Whoever killed him is unknown.
Wenceslaus III of Bohemia (16), the last Přemyslid King of Bohemia died on 4 August 1306 just short of his 17th birthday in Olomouc. It is known he was murdered, but not by whom.  Most chronicles report the murderer was a Thuringian mercenary named Conrad von Bottennstein, but this has been rejected since the real Conrad died around 1320 and the chronicles also report the supposed murderer was stabbed to death by guards moments after the murder. The person who ordered the murder is completely unknown, but most assumed it was either Albert I of Germany or Wladyslaw I of Poland, who both had political animosity towards him and against the latter of whom Wenceslaus was then marching with an army since both claimed the Kingdom of Poland as theirs.

The Holy Child of La Guardia is a Spanish Roman Catholic folk saint and the subject of a medieval blood libel in the town of La Guardia which is located in the central Spanish province of Toledo (Castile–La Mancha). An auto-da-fé was held outside of Ávila on 16 November 1491 that ended in the public execution of several Jews and conversos. The suspects "had confessed" under torture to murdering a child. People who were executed were Benito Garcia, the converso who had initially confessed to the child's murder. However, no body was ever found and there is no definite proof that a child disappeared or was killed. Because of contradictory confessions, the court had trouble coherently depicting how events possibly took place. The true identity of the child is unknown as well.
 Giovanni Borgia, 2nd Duke of Gandía, 1497; his body was recovered in the Tiber with his throat slit and about nine stab wounds on his torso. His father, Pope Alexander VI, launched an investigation only for it to end abruptly a week later. Theories range from the Orsini family to his own brothers, Cesare Borgia and Gioffre Borgia, having committed the crime.
 Moctezuma II, 1520, Aztec emperor; according to Spanish accounts he was killed by his own people; according to Aztec accounts he was assassinated by the Spanish.
 Robert Pakington (46–47), 1536, likely to have been the first person murdered with a handgun in London.
 John Knight was a British explorer who disappeared after steering his boat over a hill most likely near Nain on 23 or 24 June 1606. Some time after that it was confirmed that he has been killed by local residents, but these people were never identified and no one was charged were his murder.
 Expatriate English Royalists are believed to have ambushed and murdered Isaac Dorislaus in 1649, then a diplomat representing the interests of the Commonwealth to the Dutch government at The Hague, in retaliation for his role in the trial and execution of Charles I. No suspects were ever identified, although some Royalists later boasted of having taken part.
 Sir Edmund Berry Godfrey (56), in 1678; he was found impaled on his own sword and strangled at Primrose Hill, London. Three men were hanged, but later the witness' statement was found to be perjured.
 Jean-François Duclerc, a French privateer who was murdered in Rio de Janeiro on 18 March 1711 while he was in prison for unknown reasons by masked gunmen. The case was never solved.
 Charles XII of Sweden (36), was killed by a bullet in a siege trench in Fredrikshald, Norway while observing enemy on 30 November 1718 after it had entered the side of his head, leading to the speculation that he was shot by one of his own men.
 Alessandro Stradella (38), 1682, composer; he was stabbed to death at the Piazza Banchi of Genoa. His infidelities were well known, and many theorize that a nobleman of the Lomellini family hired the killer.
 Jean-Marie Leclair (67), 1764, violinist and composer; he was found stabbed in his Paris home. Although the murder remains a mystery, his nephew, Guillaume-François Vial, and Leclair's ex-wife were considered main suspects at the time.
 Although the colonial authorities in Pennsylvania at the time investigated the two December 1764 Paxton Boys massacres of defenseless Conestoga communities near present-day Millersville as a criminal mass murder, the perpetrators were never identified.

19th century

Elijah Parish Lovejoy (34), was an American Presbyterian minister, journalist, newspaper editor, and abolitionist. He was shot and killed on 7 November 1837 by a pro-slavery mob in Alton, Illinois, during their attack on the warehouse of Benjamin Godfrey and W. S. Gillman to destroy Lovejoy's press and abolitionist materials.
 Mary Rogers (21–22), also known as the "Beautiful Cigar Girl"; her body was found in the Hudson River on 28 July 1841. The story became a national sensation and inspired Edgar Allan Poe to write "The Mystery of Marie Rogêt" (1842).
Helen Jewett (22), American prostitute who was murdered in New York City on 10 April 1836. A young man named Richard P. Robinson was arrested and charged with her murder, but was found not guilty. The real killer was never found.
 Françoise de Choiseul-Praslin, wife of French duke Charles de Choiseul-Praslin; she died shortly after a beating and stabbing in the family's Paris apartment on 17 August 1847. Her husband was arrested, but committed suicide during trial, protesting his innocence all along. No other suspect has ever been identified. The scandal caused by the case helped to provoke the French Revolution of 1848.
 Barbu Catargiu (54), the first Prime Minister of Romania and a conservative politician, was assassinated during a parliamentary meeting on June 20, 1862. His killer was never found.
 Sakamoto Ryōma (31), was a Japanese samurai and a prominent figure in the movement to overthrow the Tokugawa shogunate who was assassinated at the Ōmiya Inn in Kyoto, not long before the Meiji Restoration took place. On the night of 10 December 1867, assassins gathered at the door of the inn and one approached and knocked, acting as an ordinary caller. The door was answered by Ryōma's bodyguard and manservant, a former sumo wrestler who told the stranger he would see if Ryōma was accepting callers at that hour of the evening. When the bodyguard turned his back, the visitor at the door drew his sword and slashed his back, which became a fatal wound.
 Nakaoka Shintarō (29), a samurai in Bakumatsu period Japan, and a close associate of Sakamoto Ryōma in the movement to overthrow the Tokugawa shogunate. was killed on 12 December 1867.
 Thomas C. Hindman (40), an American politician assassinated by one or more assailants on 27 September 1868. The assassins fired through his parlor window while he was reading his newspaper with his children in Helena, Arkansas, United States.
 Alexander Boyd was the county solicitor of Greene County, Alabama, who was lynched by the Ku Klux Klan on 31 March 1870.
 Benjamin Nathan (56), a financier turned philanthropist; was found beaten to death in his New York City home on 28 July 1870. Several suspects were identified, including Nathan's profligate son Washington, who discovered the body along with his brother, but none were ever indicted.
 Juan Prim (56), a Spanish general and statesman; in December 1870, he was shot through the windows of his carriage by several assailants and died two days later. In 2012, his body was exhumed; the autopsy showed he may have been strangled on his deathbed, but results were deemed inconclusive.
 Sharon Tyndale (65), former Illinois Secretary of State, was robbed and shot as he walked from his house in Springfield to the nearby train station early on the morning of 29 April 1871.
 George Colvocoresses (55), Greek American naval commander and explorer, died of a gunshot wound while returning to a ferryboat on 3 June 1872, in Bridgeport, Connecticut. The insurance company claimed it was suicide, but eventually settled with his family.
 John Bozeman (32), an American frontiersman who helped establish the Bozeman Trail and founded the city Bozeman, Montana, was killed under unclear circumstances along the Yellowstone River on April 20, 1867. Various theories have been proposed concerning his death, ranging from an attack by Blackfeet Indians to revenge for his flirting with women.
 Charles Bravo, a wealthy British lawyer, died of antimony poisoning on 21 April 1876. It is unclear how and why the antimony was administered to him.
 Henry Weston Smith (49), a minister, was found dead on the road between his home in Crook City, South Dakota, and Deadwood, where he was going to give a sermon, on 20 August 1876. Smith was not robbed and the motive for his killing remains unknown.
 Arthur St. Clair, an African-American community leader in Brooksville, Florida, was killed by a white mob in 1877 after presiding over an interracial marriage. The papers relating to the case were incinerated when the county courthouse was destroyed in an arson attack, preventing the killers from being found.
George Leonidas Leslie (35–36), was an American architect from New York who later became a bank robber. After Leslie had fled from the public in May 1878 he was found dead on 4 June 1878 in Yonkers, New York.
 Martin DeFoor (73), an early settler of Atlanta, Georgia, was along with his wife the victim of an axe murder on their farm on 25 July 1879.
 Two trials in Canada's Black Donnellys massacre, in which five members of a family of Irish immigrants were found murdered in the ashes of their Ontario farm after an angry mob attacked it on 4 February 1880, allegedly as a result of feuds with their neighbors, resulted in all the suspects being acquitted.
 John Henry Blake (74), agent for one of Ireland's more despised British landlords, was shot and killed along with his driver on their way to Mass outside Loughrea on 29 June 1882. The case received considerable attention at the time because Blake's employer, Hubert de Burgh-Canning, 2nd Marquess of Clanricarde, was a nobleman. Although his wife survived the attack, she was unable to identify any suspects.
American outlaw Johnny Ringo (32), was found shot dead on 14 July 1882. Although officially ruled a suicide, doubts have been cast upon the sequence of events, and both Wyatt Earp and Doc Holliday were implicated in murdering Ringo.
 Dave Rudabaugh (31), an American gunfighter and outlaw infamous for his stagecoach robberies and association with other notorious characters in the Old West, was killed in a gunfight at a saloon in Parral, Mexico. His killer(s), who decapitated him with a machete and stuck his head on a pole, has/have never been identified.
 The Rahway murder of 1887 also known as Unknown Woman and Rahway Jane Doe is the murder of an unidentified young woman whose body was found in Rahway, New Jersey on 25 March 1887. Four brothers traveling to work at the felt mills by Bloodgood's Pond in Clark, New Jersey early one morning found the young woman lying off Central Avenue near Jefferson Avenue several hundred feet from the Central Avenue Bridge over the Rahway River. Her body was very bloody and had been subjected to a beating.
 Victims of Jack The Ripper.  In the second half of 1888, at least five London women were murdered, supposedly by a serial killer.  The killer was never apprehended, and the murders are unsolved.
 The Whitehall Mystery; in 1888, the dismembered remains of a woman were discovered at three different sites in the centre of London, including the future site of Scotland Yard.
John M. Clayton (48), American politician, was shot on the evening of 29 January 1889 in Plumerville, Arkansas, after starting an investigation into possible election fraud.
Belle Starr (40), was a notorious female American outlaw. On 3 February 1889, two days before her 41st birthday, she was killed. She was riding home from a neighbor's house in Eufaula, Oklahoma when she was ambushed. Her death resulted from shotgun wounds to the back, neck, shoulder, and face.
Paul Crampel (26), a French explorer while exploring the areas of present-day Gabon and Chad in Africa was murdered on 9 April 1891 by unknown people. No one was ever charged with the crime.
The People's Grocery lynchings were a series of racially motivated confrontations  that occurred from 2–8 March 1892 in Memphis, Tennessee, culminating in the lynching of three black persons.
 Andrew Jackson Borden and Abby Durfee Borden, father and stepmother of Lizzie Borden, both killed in their family house in Fall River, Massachusetts on the morning of 4 August 1892, by blows from a hatchet. In the case of Andrew Borden, the hatchet blows not only crushed his skull, but cleanly split his left eyeball. Lizzie was later arrested and charged for the murders. At the time her stepmother was killed, Lizzie was the only other person known to have been in the house. Lizzie and the maid, Bridget Sullivan, were the only other people known to have been in the house at the time Mr. Borden was killed. Lizzie was acquitted by a jury in the following year of 1893.
 Frazier B. Baker and Julia Baker were a father and daughter who were murdered on 22 February 1898 in their own house in Lake City, South Carolina.
 The Gatton murders occurred  from the rural Australian town of Gatton, Queensland, on 26 December 1898. Siblings Michael, Norah and Ellen Murphy were found deceased the morning after they left home to attend a dance in the town hall which had been cancelled. The bodies were arranged with the feet pointing west and both women had their hands tied with handkerchiefs. This signature aspect has never been repeated in Australian crime and to date remains a mystery.
William Goebel (44), an American politician who was shot and mortally wounded on the morning of 30 January 1900 in Frankfort, Kentucky, one day before being sworn in as governor of Kentucky. The next day the dying Goebel was sworn in and, despite the best efforts of eighteen physicians attending him, died on the afternoon of 3 February 1900. Goebel remains the only state governor in the United States to die by assassination while in office.

References

Unsolved murders (before the 20th century)
Unsolved